John Cullum (born March 2, 1930) is an American actor and singer. He has appeared in many stage musicals and dramas, including Shenandoah (1975) and On the Twentieth Century (1978), winning the Tony Award for Best Leading Actor in a Musical for each. In 1966 he gained his first Tony nomination as the lead in On a Clear Day You Can See Forever, in which he introduced the title song, and more recently received Tony nominations for Urinetown The Musical (2002) (Best Actor in a Musical) and as Best Featured Actor in the revival of 110 in the Shade (2007).

Some of his other notable roles included tavern owner Holling Vincoeur in the television drama series Northern Exposure, gaining an Emmy Award nomination (Best Supporting Actor in a Drama). He was featured in fifteen episodes of the NBC television series ER as Mark Greene's father. He also played the farmer, Jim Dahlberg, in the landmark television drama The Day After. He has made multiple guest appearances on Law & Order and Law & Order: Special Victims Unit as attorney, now judge, Barry Moredock, and appeared as Big Mike in several episodes of The Middle. He also appeared as Senator Beau Carpenter on the CBS series, Madam Secretary.

Personal life
Cullum was born on March 2, 1930 in Knoxville, Tennessee. He attended Knoxville High School and the University of Tennessee. He played on the university's Southeastern Conference championship tennis team and was a member of Phi Gamma Delta. He starred in "Chucky Jack", an outdoor drama about Tennessee Governor John Sevier, at the old Hunter Hills Theater in Gatlinburg.

Cullum has been married to Emily Frankel since 1959. They have one son, JD Cullum (John David Cullum), who is also an actor.

Career
He made his Broadway debut as Sir Dinadan in the Alan Jay Lerner/Frederick Loewe musical Camelot in 1960. He also understudied Richard Burton (King Arthur) and Roddy McDowall (Arthur's son Mordred), going on four times when Burton became ill and succeeding McDowall. He went on to play Laertes opposite Burton's 1964 Broadway performance as Hamlet (and in the film version of the production) and in Burton's final Broadway appearance in Noël Coward's Private Lives in 1983.

In 1965, he was called in to replace Louis Jourdan during the Boston tryout of the musical On a Clear Day You Can See Forever. It was his first starring role on Broadway, netting him a Theatre World Award and his first Tony Award nomination. The original cast album received a Grammy Award (presented to lyricist Alan Jay Lerner and composer Burton Lane).

He portrayed Edward Rutledge of South Carolina in the Broadway musical 1776, providing a dramatic highlight with his performance of "Molasses to Rum," a tirade against the hypocrisy of some Northerners over the slave trade ("They don't keep slaves, but they are willing to be considerable carriers of slaves to others. They're willing – for the shilling.") Cullum had been the third Rutledge on Broadway, but played the role the longest and repeated it for the 1972 film.

He is well known for premiering the role of Charlie Anderson in the musical Shenandoah, which began at Goodspeed Opera House, Connecticut in 1974. Cullum won the Tony, Drama Desk and Outer Critics Circle Awards when the show was produced on Broadway in 1975. He also played the role at Wolf Trap, Virginia, in June 1976, opened the national tour for 3 weeks in Fall 1977 in Chicago, and starred in the limited run Broadway revival in 1989.

He followed Shenandoah by playing the maniacal Broadway producer Oscar Jaffee in the 1978 musical On the Twentieth Century, opposite Madeline Kahn and later Judy Kaye, earning his second Tony Award. He received his fourth Tony nomination in 2002 for originating the role of evil moneygrubber corporate president Caldwell B. Cladwell in Urinetown The Musical. He earned his fifth Tony nomination in the 2007 revival of 110 in the Shade, playing H.C. Curry, father to Audra McDonald's Lizzie.

In 2003, Cullum co-starred with Northern Exposure castmate Barry Corbin in Blackwater Elegy, an award-winning short film written by Matthew Porter and co-directed by Porter and Joe O'Brien.

Later Broadway appearances include the title role of William Shakespeare's seldom-performed Cymbeline, at Lincoln Center in 2007 and August: Osage County, by Tracy Letts for the week of September 16, 2008, and then since November 11, 2008.

In addition to enjoying a long stage career, he is well known to television audiences for his regular role as Holling Vincoeur on the quirky CBS series Northern Exposure, his extended appearances on the NBC medical drama ER as Mark Greene's father, and on Law & Order: Special Victims Unit as constitutional lawyer and later judge, Barry Moredock. Cullum has also appeared as Lucky Strike executive Lee Garner, Sr. on AMC's Mad Men. He appeared as Leap Day William, the embodiment of the fictional Leap Day national holiday, in the "Leap Day" episode of the sixth season of NBC's 30 Rock.

John Cullum appeared on Broadway in The Scottsboro Boys (2010), a musical by Kander and Ebb about a notorious miscarriage of justice in the American South in the 1930s. The Scottsboro Boys was directed by Susan Stroman.

John Cullum was inducted into the Theatre Hall of Fame in 2007.

In 2015 Cullum appeared and sang in the satirical B&W period movie-musical footage of Daddy's Boy on Unbreakable Kimmy Schmidt. The "forgotten footage" features comically incestuous lyrics set in an innocent context that apes classic 1930's films.

Cullum, then an octogenarian, joined the cast of Waitress as Joe on October 12, 2017, replacing Larry Marshall.

Work

Stage productions

Camelot (1960) – Sir Dinadan
Infidel Caesar (1962)
The Rehearsal (1963)
Hamlet (1963) – Laertes
On a Clear Day You Can See Forever (1965) – Dr. Mark Bruckner
Man of La Mancha (1967) – Cervantes/Don Quixote
1776 (1972) – Edward Rutledge
Vivat! Vivat Regina! (1972)
Shenandoah (1975) – Charlie Anderson
The Trip Back Down (1977)
On the Twentieth Century (1978)
Deathtrap (1979) – Sidney Bruhl
Private Lives (1983) – Victor Prynne
Doubles (1985)
The Boys in Autumn (1986) – Huck
You Never Can Tell (1986)
Shenandoah (revival) (1989) – Charlie Anderson
Aspects of Love (1990) – George Dillingham
Show Boat (1994) – Cap'n Andy Hawkes
Man of La Mancha (1995) – Don Quixote/Cervantes
All My Sons (1997) – Joe Keller
Urinetown (2001) – Caldwell B. Cladwell
Sin: a Cardinal Deposed (2005) – Cardinal Law
Dr. Seuss' How the Grinch Stole Christmas! (2006)
110 in the Shade (2007) – H.C. Curry
Cymbeline (2008) – King Cymbeline
August: Osage County (2009)
The Scottsboro Boys (2010)
 Measure for Measure (Shakespeare in the Park) 2011 – Vincentio
 All's Well That Ends Well (Shakespeare in the Park) 2011 – The Duke
 Casa Valentina (2014)
 Waitress (2016)

Filmography

All the Way Home (1963) – Andrew
Hamlet (1964) – Laertes
Hawaii (1966) – Rev. Immanuel Quigley
They Call Me Trinity (1971)
1776 (1972) – Edward Rutledge (SC)
The Act (1983) – The President
The Prodigal (1983) – Elton Stuart
Marie (1985) – Deputy Attorney General
Sweet Country (1987) – Ben
The Secret Life of Algernon (1998) – Algernon Pendleton
Ricochet River (1998)
Held Up (1999) – Jack
Inherit the Wind (1999)
Blackwater Elegy (2003)
The Notorious Bettie Page (2006)
The Night Listener (2006)
The Conspirator (2011)
Kill Your Darlings (2013)
Kilimanjaro (2013)
Adult World (2013)
Before We Go (2014)
Love Is Strange (2014)
Christine (2016)
Jungleland (2019)

Television

The Edge of Night (1966–67)
The Bell Telephone Hour - "The Lyrics of Alan Jay Lerner" (1966)
One Life to Live (1969)
Roll of Thunder, Hear My Cry (1978)
The Day After (1983)
The Equalizer (1986)
Buck James (1987)
Quantum Leap – "To Catch A Falling Star" (1989)
Northern Exposure (1990–95)
Nothing Sacred – "Mixed Blessings" (1997) Joe Keneally
Touched By An Angel – "It Came Upon A Midnight Clear" (1997) Mark Twain
To Have and To Hold (1998)
ER (1997–2000)
Law & Order (2001)
Law & Order: Special Victims Unit (2003–present)
Mad Men (2007)
The Middle (2009–2018)
30 Rock (2012)
The Good Wife – "Death of a Client" (2013) Cardinal James
Nurse Jackie (2013)
Unbreakable Kimmy Schmidt (2015)
Thanksgiving (2016)
Madam Secretary (2017)
The Blacklist (2019)

Awards and nominations

Awards
1966 Theatre World Award – On a Clear Day You Can See Forever
1975 Drama Desk Award Outstanding Actor, Musical – Shenandoah
1975 Outer Critics Circle Award, Best Performances – Shenandoah
1975 Tony Award Best Actor in a Musical – Shenandoah
1978 Tony Award Best Actor in a Musical – On the Twentieth Century
1982 Drama Desk Award for Unique Theatrical Experience for the one-man show Whistler
1998 Founders Day Medal, University of Tennessee
2004 Clarence Brown Theatre Company (University of Tennessee), Lifetime Achievement Award
2007 Inductee American Theatre Hall of Fame

Nominations
1966 Tony Award Best Actor in a Musical – On a Clear Day You Can See Forever
1993 Emmy Award Best Supporting Actor in a Drama – Northern Exposure
2002 Outer Critics Circle Award Outstanding Actor in a Musical – Urinetown
2002 Tony Award Best Actor in a Musical – Urinetown
2005 Drama Desk Award for Outstanding Actor in a Play – Sin (A Cardinal Deposed)
2007 Tony Award Best Featured Actor in a Musical – 110 in the Shade
2008 Drama Desk Award, Outstanding Featured Actor in a Play – The Conscientious Objector

References

External links
 
 
 
 Star File: John Cullum

American male singers
American male musical theatre actors
American male television actors
Living people
People from Knoxville, Tennessee
Tony Award winners
Drama Desk Award winners
Male actors from Tennessee
University of Tennessee alumni
20th-century American male actors
21st-century American male actors
American male film actors
Year of birth missing (living people)